Awthaw is the name of several villages in Burma:

Awthaw (25°16'0"N 95°'13"E) -Homalin Township, Sagaing Region
Awthaw (24°46'0"N 95°2'0"E) -Homalin Township, Sagaing Region